The Plymouth and South West Co-operative Society Limited, known locally as Plymco, was founded in 1859 by ten tradesmen. The society grew from 18 members, as recorded on 3 January 1860, to a membership of over 130,000. The department store business was sold to Vergo Retail in 2009.

Members approved a merger with the larger Co-operative Group (of which the society was a corporate member) at a series of members' meetings during 2009. The merger occurred on 6 September 2009.

References

Companies based in Plymouth, Devon
Defunct retail companies of the United Kingdom
1859 establishments in England
2009 disestablishments in England
Defunct companies of England
British companies disestablished in 2009
British companies established in 1859
Consumers' co-operatives of the United Kingdom